The 2021 Davis Cup World Group II Knock-outs will be held on 26–28 November 2021. The two winners of this round will qualify for the 2022 Davis Cup World Group I Play-offs while the two losers will qualify for the 2022 Davis Cup World Group II Play-offs.

Teams
Four teams will play for two spots in the World Group I Play-offs, in series decided on a home and away basis.

These four teams are:
 4 lowest-ranked winning teams from World Group II.

The 2 winning teams from the knock-outs will play at the World Group I Play-offs and the 2 losing teams will play at the World Group II Play-offs.

''#: Nations Ranking as of 20 September 2021.

Seeded teams
  (#55)
  (#56)

Unseeded teams
  (#60)
  (#62)

The draw was held on 22 September 2021.

Results summary

Knock-outs results

Tunisia vs. Zimbabwe

Morocco vs. Denmark

References

External links

2020–21 Davis Cup